Morpholeria ruficornis  is a species of fly in the family Heleomyzidae. It is found in the Palearctic.

References

External links
Images representing Heleomyzinae at BOLD

Heleomyzidae
Insects described in 1830
Muscomorph flies of Europe